Iranian monarchism is the advocacy of restoring the monarchy in Iran, which was abolished after the 1979 Revolution.

Historical background
Iran first became a constitutional monarchy in 1906, but underwent a period of autocracy during the years 1925–1941, after which the Iranian National Assembly was restored to power. During the years 1941 to 1953, Iran remained a constitutional monarchy and active parliamentary democracy with Shah Mohammad Reza Pahlavi retaining extensive legal executive powers.

On March 15, 1951, the National Assembly, led by Prime Minister Hossein Ala, unanimously voted to nationalize the oil industry, which at the time was dominated by the Anglo-Iranian Oil Company (now BP). In 1953, the British MI6 and American CIA orchestrated a coup against Mohammed Mossadegh's government. Agents fueled rumors that the republican-minded Mossadegh was planning on abolishing the monarchy and declaring himself president of a new Republic of Iran, leading to a pro-monarchist backlash from the public and leading to a successful result in the coup against the prime minister.

The Shah, who had gone into exile during the coup, returned to Iran and named General Fazlollah Zahedi as the new prime minister. Many contemporary sources attribute the coup, or counter coup, entirely to the U.S. American CIA (CIA Coup) and agents of the British MI6 who are reported to have organized and paid for it.   These sources point to many other coups in which the CIA was instrumental, such as those in Congo (1964), Chile (1973), and Algeria (1991). Monarchists, however, argue that the counter-coup was in fact a popular uprising, and that the foreign intelligence agencies' undeniable involvement was peripheral. At least some historians argue the coup could not have taken place without both CIA organizing and Iranian support.

Afterwards, the era of constitutional monarchy gradually came to an end as the Shah increasingly exercised his executive powers unilaterally, thus leading towards the development of autocracy. By the early 1970s, with most political parties having been banned, Iran had effectively become a one-party state under Rastakhiz. National Front leaders like Karim Sanjabi and moderate traditional Islamic leaders like Mohammad Kazem Shariatmadari continued to espouse a constitutional monarchy.

Under increasing international pressure, particularly from President Jimmy Carter of the United States, the Shah pushed forward major democratic reforms in the late 1970s, designed to gradually restore the constitutional monarchy as it had originally been. However, several uprisings in 1978 and 1979 culminated in the Shah, who had been diagnosed with terminal cancer and had kept the fact secret, to leave the country with his family to seek treatment overseas. Within several days the Shah's government had effectively collapsed and the Second Revolution had begun. The new provisional revolutionary government officially abolished the monarchy and declared Iran to be a republic. The following year, in 1980, the Islamic Republic of Iran was established under the Supreme Leadership of Ruhollah Khomeini.

In the months following the Revolution, former Field Marshal of the Imperial Armed Forces Bahram Aryana organized a counter-revolution in exile. Based in Paris, France, with other military officials of the Imperial Armed Forces and Prince Shahriar Shafiq, he established Azadegan, a paramilitary resistance intended to help restore the constitutional monarchy. Fearing a growing counter-revolution, Prince Shahriar was assassinated in Paris in December 1979 by Khomeinist agents, which was a major setback for the monarchist resistance. Despite a number of successful operations which garnered international media attention in 1980 and 1981, the outbreak of war between Iran and Iraq officially brought any hope for counter-revolution to an end.

In the 1990s and the decade following 2000, the Shah's reputation has staged something of a revival, with many Iranians looking back on his era as a time when Iran was more prosperous and the government less oppressive. Journalist Afshin Molavi reports even members of the uneducated poor - traditionally core supporters of the revolution that overthrew the Shah - making remarks such as 'God bless the Shah's soul, the economy was better then;' and finds that "books about the former Shah (even censored ones) sell briskly," while "books of the Rightly Guided Path sit idle."

Monarchist parties
Monarchist parties and organizations are strictly prohibited by the government of the Islamic Republic of Iran and monarchists and their sympathizers are subject to imprisonment if discovered. However, monarchists remain active in Los Angeles and maintain links with their organizations and parties in Europe such as Azadegan, the Constitutionalist Party and Rastakhiz.

Monarchist groups such as Azadegan and Constitutionalist only advocate for the restoration of the constitutional monarchy, without necessarily endorsing the Pahlavi dynasty, the Qajar dynasty or any other Iranian royal dynasty. Rastakhiz specifically calls for the return of the House of Pahlavi to the throne, while the Kingdom Assembly of Iran is opposed to a Pahlavi restoration.

The former Crown Prince of Iran, Reza Pahlavi, himself does not advocate the restoration of his dynasty, instead stating that the matter is for Iranians themselves to decide in a national referendum whether or not to restore the constitutional monarchy with the restoration of the House of Pahlavi.

Monarchist political parties
 Rastakhiz
 Constitutionalist Party of Iran
 Sarbazan and Janbakhtegan

See also
Politics of Iran
Political parties in Iran
Kingdom Assembly of Iran
 List of monarchs of Persia
 List of Shahbanus of Persia

References

External links
Azadegan

 
Restoration of the monarchy